Cheesecloth is a loose-woven gauze-like carded cotton cloth used primarily in cheesemaking and cooking.

Grades 

Cheesecloth is available in at least seven different grades, from open to extra-fine weave. Grades are distinguished by the number of threads per inch in each direction.

Uses

Food preparation
The primary use of cheesecloth is in some styles of cheesemaking, where it is used to remove whey from cheese curds, and to help hold the curds together as the cheese is formed. Cheesecloth is also used in straining stocks and custards, bundling herbs, making tofu and ghee, and thickening yogurt. Queso blanco and queso fresco are Spanish and Mexican cheeses that are made from whole milk using cheesecloth. Quark is a type of German unsalted cheese that is sometimes formed with cheesecloth. Paneer is a kind of Indian fresh cheese that is commonly made with cheesecloth. Fruitcake is wrapped in rum-infused cheesecloth during the process of "feeding" the fruitcake as it ripens.

Manufacturing, testing and preservation
Cheesecloth can also be used for several printmaking processes including lithography for wiping up gum arabic. In intaglio, a heavily-starched cheesecloth called tarlatan is used for wiping away excess ink from the printing surface.

Cheesecloth #60 is used in product safety and regulatory testing for potential fire hazards. Cheesecloth is wrapped tightly over the device under test, which is then subjected to simulated conditions such as lightning surges conducted through power or telecom cables, power faults, etc. The device may be destroyed but must not ignite the cheesecloth. This is to ensure that the device can fail safely, and not start electrical fires in the vicinity.

Cheesecloth made to United States Federal Standard CCC-C-440 is used to test the durability of optical coatings per United States Military Standard MIL-C-48497. The optical surface is examined for streaks or scratches, and then its optical performance is measured to ensure that no deterioration occurred.

Cheesecloth is used in India and Pakistan for making summer shirts. Cheesecloth material shirts were popular for beachwear during the 1960s and 1970s in the United States. Cheesecloth has been used to create the illusion of "ectoplasm" during spirit channelling or other ghost-related phenomena.

Cheesecloth has a use in anatomical dissection laboratories to slow the process of desiccation. The cloth can be soaked with a preservative solution such as formalin then wrapped around the specimen or at other times simply wrapped first then sprayed with water.

See also

Muslin
Pudding cloth

References 

Woven fabrics
Food preparation utensils